Face à face was a French political television programme, created by Jean Farran and Igor Barrère and shown on la première chaîne of ORTF from 24 February to 3 October 1966 when it was replaced by En direct avec.

French television news shows